Pauline Hoarau (born 3 February 1994) is a French model from Réunion.

Career
In 2011, Pauline Hoarau won the Elite Model Look conquest in Réunion and represented it at the international final. She placed in the top 15 and signed contracts with several agencies of the Elite Model Management group.

She was nominated at the  Future Awards 2014.

In 2017, she appeared in Luc Besson's Valerian and the City of a Thousand Planets (scene: Paradise Alley - 'Creature; Swing Angel').

She has advertised Armani Exchange, H&M, Jason Wu, Ralph Lauren, Tommy Hilfiger and Topshop. She has walked more than 200 fashion shows.

She has been on the covers of Elle (France, Italia, Mexico) and French Revue des Modes. She has also been featured in editorials for Amica, CR Fashion Book, Crash Magazine, Elle (France, Italia, Mexico, Vietnam), Glass Magazine, Harper's Bazaar (US, UK), Interview (Germany, Russia, US), LOVE, Numéro, SKP Magazine, Teen Vogue, Vogue Japan and Wonderland Magazine.

Personal life 
On 12 March 2021, Hoarau and her partner Simon Thoret announced that they were expecting their first child., On 4 July 2021, they had a son.

References

External links

French female models
1994 births
Living people
Women from Réunion